Class 171 may refer to:

 British Rail Class 171, a type of diesel multiple-unit train
 Class 171, a Caledonian Railway 0-4-4T steam locomotive
 DRG Class ET 171, a three-car electric multiple-unit train